Eugène Sylvester Peters (Eindhoven, December 1, 1946) is a Dutch painter, printmaker and sculptor.

Biography 
After starting a degree course at the Academie voor Industriële Vormgeving in 1964 Eugène Peters left in 1968 after being offered an internship at Royal Sphinx, a designer and manufacturer of toilet bowls and other ceramic items. While there, a fellow artist, Cornelis Le Mair, recommended he should move to Antwerp, where he went on to study graphic design at the Royal Academy of Fine Arts from 1968 to 1971. His teachers in Antwerp included the etcher René De Coninck, himself a pupil of Jules De Bruycker, as well as the engraver Mark Severin, who designed several Belgian postage stamps, and Jos Hendrickx.

Having trained as a graphic designer Eugène found that this discipline offered insufficient satisfaction and so decided to teach himself to paint. He is entirely self-taught and studied the Old Masters and their techniques as a basis for developing his own unique style. Many creatures in his paintings seem nevertheless to have stepped straight out of a Hieronymus Bosch landscape, while he has also drawn inspiration from artists such as Pieter Breughel the Elder and, to take a more contemporary example, Pyke Koch.

Although others have regularly sought to classify him as a surrealist or magic realist, he himself prefers to be seen as a detail or fine art painter or, if you like, as a fantastic realist.

The influence of Fantastic Realism on his work can be seen in his meticulously painted animals, with their coats fringed with exquisite fur or lace collars, or kitted out with all sorts of strange weaponry, ranging from a lance or spear to a burnt matchstick. As well as Towers of Babylon, his works regularly feature Pierrot, Harlequin and other characters from the Commedia dell'arte, as well as imaginary and real cities such as Antwerp and Turnhout.

While continuing to paint he also later taught himself to cast statues in bronze. Although this began as an experiment, it has since become a true passion, and the statues he makes can genuinely be seen as the three-dimensional counterparts of the characters in his paintings.

His work also includes engraving and glass painting.

He married Anna Carolina Honings on January 25, 1978, and the couple has two daughters.

Museums 
Museums owning works by Eugène Peters include:
Antwerp Zoo museum
Markiezenhof in Bergen op Zoom

Other information 
Commissions in bronze:
Statuette for the annual AKO Prize for Literature
Bronze plaque commemorating the artist Claude Monet in the Southern French city of Antibes
Annual ‘golden plume’ for Unizo Turnhout (Union of Self-Employed Entrepreneurs)
Young Talent prize for the Jacques de Leeuw Foundation
Statue of Monsignor Bekkers for the Jacques de Leeuw Foundation

External links 
Official website

References 
Netherlands Institute for Art History. Record number: 
Beeldend Benelux : biografisch handboek, P.M.J.E. Jacobs, part 4, p. 597, Stichting Studiecentrum voor beeldende kunst, Tilburg, 2000
Eugène Peters, Galerie Bonnard, Nuenen, 1988
Kunstenaars Jaarboek, 2011
Catalogus Lineart (17–25 October 1987)
Art Expo Jaarboek (1997, p. 106 - 107)
The Art of Living (No. 1, 2003 / No. 1, 2008 B; No. 2, 2008 NL/ December 2003)
Art School, Year 12, No. 83 (January 1997, p. 10 - 15)
Tekenen en Schilderen, Year 1, No. 3 (March 1986, p. 12 - 17)
Kunstwerk (April/May 1990, p. 46 - 47)
Zie magazine (No. 5, January 1983, p. 38 - 39)
Avant Garde (Year 15, No. 2, February 1994, p. 121; Year 14, No. 1, p. 174)
Privé (March 1994, week 9, p. 32 - 33)
Rails (April 1997, p. 64)
Cannes Rivièra Magazine, (No. 6, 2001, p. 77)
Tableau Fine Arts Agenda, 1997
Bernaerts Auction House Catalogue, April 2005
Antwerp Zoo Catalogue, March 1975 (Illustrated Inventory of the Zoo's Art Collection)
Brabants Dagblad, 30 October 2012 (Awarding of AKO Prize for Literature)
Gazet van Antwerpen, 30 October 2012 (Awarding of AKO Prize for Literature)
Nice Matin, 23 April 2000 (Hommage à Claude Monet)
Gazet van Antwerpen, 27 October 2000 (Awarding of AKO Prize for Literature)
Utrecht Art Fair, April 1981
Tableau (Year 6, No. 3, Dec./Jan. 1983/1984; Year 8, No. 2, Nov. 1985; Year 9, No. 6, summer 1987; Year 10, No. 3, Dec. 1987: Year 14, No. 2, Nov. 1991: Year 19, No. 5, April 1997; Year 24, No. 5, Nov. 2002; Year 25, No. 2, April 2003 (cover and p. 9)

1946 births
Living people
Dutch painters
Dutch male painters
Dutch printmakers
Dutch sculptors
Dutch male sculptors
People from Eindhoven